Paul Marsh is an American mining executive and politician who is serving as the 12th Arizona State Mine Inspector. Governor Doug Ducey appointed Marsh to the position in October 2021, upon the resignation of Joe Hart. A member of the Republican Party, Marsh ran for a full term in the 2022 general election. On November 8, 2022, Marsh won the Mine Inspector election unopposed.

Early life and education
Marsh was born and raised in Metro Phoenix and served in the Marine Corps Reserve from June 1990 to June 1997. In 2011, Marsh started working in the cement industry for CalPortland Company.

Mine Inspector of Arizona
Marsh was appointed by Governor Doug Ducey in October 2021 to fill out the term of Joe Hart, upon his resignation. Marsh ran for a full-term as Mine Inspector and won unopposed.

References

External links 

Paul Marsh on Arizona State Mine Inspector's Website
Campaign Website

Arizona Republicans
Candidates in the 2022 United States elections
Living people
Date of birth unknown
Year of birth missing (living people)